The fourth season of Ídolos premiered in September 12, 2010, on SIC, with the castings held in Lisbon, Portugal. Sandra Pereira won the show, making her the first female winner of the series. The runner-up was Martim Vicente, who was the judges' wildcard choice to make the top 10.

Judges
Manuel Moura dos Santos
Laurent Filipe - Musician
Roberta Medina - Director of Rock in Rio
Pedro Boucherie - Director of the cable TV stations of SIC.
Ídolos 2010 - Season 4 Official website

Top 14 (Idols' Choice)

Wild Card

Top 10 (80's)

Top 9 (Cinema)

Top 8 (Worldwide Music)

Top 7 (Unforgettable Voices)

Top 6 (21st Century)

Top 5 (Viewers' Choice and Judges' Choice)

Top 5 (Love Songs & Passion)

Top 3 (Dedications)

Elimination chart

References

Season 04
2010 Portuguese television seasons